James Glennon (born 7 July 1953) is an Irish former Fianna Fáil politician and former Irish International rugby player.  He was a Teachta Dála for the Dublin North constituency from 2002 to 2007.

Glennon was born in Skerries, County Dublin in 1953. He was educated at Mount St. Joseph's school in Roscrea, County Tipperary. A former rugby union international he was capped six times for Ireland as a second row forward. He is a former coach and manager to the Leinster senior team and is also a former manager to the Ireland under 19 and Ireland under 21 teams. His uncle Gerrard McGowan was a Labour Party TD in the 1930s.

Glennon first held political office when he was elected to Seanad Éireann in a by-election. He remained there until 2002 when he was elected to Dáil Éireann at the 2002 general election. Glennon was Vice-chairman of the Oireachtas Committee on Arts, Sport, Tourism, Community, Rural and Gaeltacht Affairs from 2002 to 2007. He was also a member of the Oireachtas Transport Committee and of the Oireachtas Committee on Procedures and Privileges. Glennon chaired a session of the Dublin Forum – a Fianna Fáil project to allow Dublin residents discuss issues of political significance. He was part of the TV3 Rugby World Cup coverage in 2007.

In October 2006, Glennon surprisingly announced that he would not be standing at the 2007 general election.

References

 

1953 births
Living people
Fianna Fáil senators
Fianna Fáil TDs
Ireland international rugby union players
Irish rugby union players
Irish sportsperson-politicians
Leinster Rugby non-playing staff
Members of the 21st Seanad
Members of the 29th Dáil
Politicians from Fingal
Sportspeople from Fingal
Rugby union players from County Dublin
People from Skerries, Dublin
Rugby union locks